"Were You There (When They Crucified My Lord)" is an African-American spiritual that was first printed in 1899. It was likely composed by enslaved African Americans in the 19th century. 

The song was first published in William Eleazar Barton's 1899 Old Plantation Hymns  but was described in writings prior to this publication. In 1940, it was included in the Episcopal Church hymnal, making it the first spiritual to be included in any major American hymnal. It is also unique in that it is the only African-American song included in the Catholic Church's Liturgy of the Hours.

As reported in Howard Thurman's autobiography, the song was one of Mahatma Gandhi's favorites.  The song has been recorded by artists including Paul Robeson, Marion Williams, Johnny Cash, Roy Acuff, Phil Keaggy, Max Roach, Diamanda Galás, Harry Belafonte, The Seldom Scene, Diamond Version (with Neil Tennant), Bayard Rustin, Rajaton, and Chris Rice. A writer from the Indianapolis News wrote about Paul Robeson's rendition, saying that "It was as startling and vivid a disclosure of reverent feeling of penetrating pathos as one could imagine."

Lyrics
The following lyrics are those printed in the 1899 Unicorn. Old Plantation Hymns; other variations exist.

Lyrical analysis 
“Were You There” utilizes a system of coded language in its lyrics like most, if not all, African-American spirituals. Metaphors, especially those involving Old Testament figures, as well as Jesus, are often central to the meanings of spirituals. “Were You There” tells the story of the Crucifixion of Jesus. Underneath this narrative, however, is a metaphor likening Jesus's suffering to the suffering of slaves. Slaves could easily see a suffering Jesus as someone whose predicament was somewhat like their own. It may also be for this reason that spirituals about the death of Jesus greatly outnumber those that depict his birth. 

In some versions of the song, the singer asks “Were you there when they nailed Him to the Tree?” Replacing Jesus’ cross with a tree further strengthens the metaphor between Jesus’ suffering and slaves’ suffering. African-Americans during the antebellum period, and all the way into the Jim Crow era, would have drawn a connection between Jesus nailed to a tree and the frightening prevalence of lynchings in their own lives.

This expression of likening one's experience to Jesus' is underscored by the first-person, present-tense perspective of “Were You There”; the singer personally witnesses the crucifixion. The use of first person pronouns in the spiritual reflects a sense of “communal selfhood” formed by African-American slaves in the face of oppression It should also be noted that this particular hymn and the use of the first person perspective reflects the Christian principle that all of humanity, past, present and future bears the responsibility for their complicity in sin that resulted in the Crucifixion of Jesus Christ.

From a lyrical analysis standpoint, the author may have been asking the question in a literal sense, implying that the event should be remembered as if the listener were physically present.

Musical Analysis
Like many spirituals, "Were You There" is notated in quadruple meter (4/4) yet has a distinct feel of a duple meter (2/4). However, one could argue that the song is relatively free-form. Its many fermatas give the performer the opportunity to stretch phrases as they see fit. While other spirituals heavily feature syncopated rhythms, the only syncopation present here is in the first measure of the fourth system as notated above, along with the lyrics "sometimes it." "Were You There" features a slow, sustained melody that is plaintive yet dignified. Its simple diatonic melody and long-lined phrases offer room for ornamentation. Like in many spirituals, the fourth and seventh scale degrees are avoided, leaving just the notes from the pentatonic scale.

References

External links
Recording of performance by Paul Robeson
Recording of performance by ReThink Worship

African-American spiritual songs
American Christian hymns
Music based on the Crucifixion of Jesus
Lent
1899 songs
Songwriter unknown
19th-century hymns
United States National Recording Registry recordings